Traulia azureipennis is a species of grasshopper in the family Acrididae. It is found in Southeast Asia.

Subspecies
These subspecies belong to the species Traulia azureipennis:
 Traulia azureipennis atra Willemse, 1921
 Traulia azureipennis azureipennis (Serville, 1838)

References

External links

 

Catantopinae